Nathaniel Mensah, known by the stage name Ajeezay is a Ghanaian comedian, actor and musician. He is a one-liner comedian referred to as the Nonfa King or King of Nonfa, nonfa is a Ghanaian jargon for ambiguity.

Early life and career 
Ajeezay who is the last of six children was born to Madam Christiana Fofo Allotey and Mr Mensah, a lawyer who is late. He took his BECE at JHS 1 where he passed and attended the Nsaba Presbyterian Senior High School. He graduated with First Class Honours in Bachelor of Science in Education and majored in Chemistry and Biology at the University of Cape Coast.

Ajeezay on 5 December 2020 released his first ever EP titled Evolution, the EP featured names like Rhyme Sonny, Koo Ntakra, Kahpun, Amerado, Teflon Flexx, Ay Poyoo, Brella, Nii Funny, Teshieboi, Bortey and Kuuku Black.

Discography

Album 

 Evolution EP

Selected singles 
 Nonfa King
 Open School
 Apor
 Saw Me
 Sugar Mummy
 Omo Ata
 App
 Nungua
 Jerusalem Soup
 M3kor
 Amanfour Bet
 Dr UN Wakasa
 Kokonte
 Sexual Sponsor
 I Love You Tui Tui

Videography 

 Open School
 Apor
 Sugar Mummy
 Omo Ata
 App
 Nungua
 Jerusalem Soup
 M3kor
 Amanfour Bet
 Dr UN Wakasa
 Kokonte
 Sexual Sponsor
 I Love You Tui Tui

Video vixen 
Agbeshie - No Worries

Ruff n Smooth - Shaba

Shatta Wale - Bie Gya

Filmography

Online Skits 
 Area Boy
 Tit 4 Tat
 Problem Child
 Condom Wahala
 Running Mate
 The Interview
 Make Up Swimming Pool
 Turn Me On

Awards and nominations

Controversies 
Ajeezay was caught in a hot tug of war with Nigerian comedian Josh2Funny after he accused him of stealing and rebranding his famous wordplay #NonfaChallenge game to #DontLeaveMeChallenge.

Philanthropy 
Ajeezay together with members of the ABLE Initiative on 3 March 2019 presented some gift items to the amputated Elizabeth Asantewaa in Dansoman. Elizabeth Asantewaa is known to have saved Ghana's first president Kwame Nkrumah from a bomb attack during the 1964 Independence Day celebration.

References

External links 
 
 

Ghanaian comedians
Living people
Ghanaian male film actors
Year of birth missing (living people)